The following is a list of courts and tribunals in Tasmania:

List of boards, commissions, courts, and tribunals

Sitting boards, commissions, courts, and tribunals
The list of sitting boards and commissions is sourced from the Service Tasmania Online portal.

Sitting boards and councils
Agricultural, Silvicultural and Veterinary Chemicals Council
Guardianship and Administration Board
Legal Profession Board of Tasmania
Local Government Board
Motor Accidents Insurance Board
National Parks and Wildlife Advisory Council
Nomenclature Board
Parole Board
Poppy Advisory and Control Board
Road Safety Advisory Council
Schools Registration Board
State Fire Management Council of Tasmania
Tasmanian Development Board
Tasmanian Heritage Council
Teachers Registration Board
Veterinary Board of Tasmania
Workcover Tasmania

Sitting authorities
Environment Protection Authority
Forest Practices Authority
Marine and Safety Tasmania
Port Arthur Historic Site
Wellington Park Management Trust

Sitting courts
Magistrates Court of Tasmania
Coroners Court of Tasmania
Supreme Court of Tasmania

Sitting tribunals
The following are sourced from the Tasmanian Department of Justice website.
Anti-Discrimination Tribunal
Asbestos Compensation Tribunal
Forest Practices Tribunal
Guardianship and Administration Board
Health Practitioners Tribunal
Mental Health Tribunal
Mining Tribunal
Motor Accidents Compensation Tribunal
Resource Management and Planning Appeal Tribunal
Workers Rehabilitation and Compensation Tribunal

Abolished boards, courts and tribunals

Abolished boards

Abolished courts

Abolished tribunals

See also

Australian court hierarchy
Government of Tasmania

References

Tasmania

Courts and tribunals